Taro Daniel was the defending champion but chose not to defend his title.

Alexander Ritschard won the title while leading 7–5, 6–5 after Henri Laaksonen retired in the final.

Seeds

Draw

Finals

Top half

Bottom half

References

External links
Main draw
Qualifying draw

Hamburg Ladies and Gents Cup - 1